Mario Doniel Bates (born January 16, 1973) is a former American football running back in the National Football League (NFL) for the New Orleans Saints, Arizona Cardinals, and the Detroit Lions. His brother, Michael, also played in the NFL.

Playing for the 1993 Arizona State Sun Devils, he carried the ball 246 times for 1,162 yards with 8 TD in just 11 games.  He became a 2nd Round pick in the 1994 NFL Draft.

NFL career statistics

References

1973 births
Living people
American football running backs
Arizona State Sun Devils football players
New Orleans Saints players
Arizona Cardinals players
Detroit Lions players
People from Victoria, Texas